Tapinocephalidae was an advanced family of tapinocephalians. It is defined as the clade containing Ulemosaurus, Tapinocaninus, and the Tapinocephalinae. They are known from both Russia and South Africa. In all probability, the Tapinocephalidae had a worldwide (Pangean) distribution. They flourished briefly during the Wordian and Capitanian ages, radiating into several lineages, existing simultaneously, and differing mainly in details of the skull and, to an even lesser degree, the skeleton. It is not clear how such similar animals could each find their own ecological niche, but such was obviously the case. There is a parallel here with the hadrosaur and ceratopsian dinosaurs of the Late Cretaceous. The cause of their abrupt extinction is not clear, since other smaller animals, and even the pareiasaurs, were not affected. Quite probably, like the extinction of the late Pleistocene megafauna, a number of factors were involved.

Description

The body is deep and capacious, allowing for a developed herbivore gut. The shoulders are much higher than the pelvic region, so that the back slopes, giraffe-fashion, from neck to tail. This seems to imply that they fed on vegetation of about a meter or more from the ground. The limbs are heavy, with sturdy forelegs that sprawled out to the sides, while the longer hind legs were placed directly under the hips (the dicynodonts had the same posture). The feet are broad and short.

Skull

The tapinocephalid skull is massively constructed, and either long-snouted (e.g. Struthiocephalus) or high and short (e.g. Moschops). Very often the top of the head is rounded, and the bones of the forehead are elevated into a sort of dome or boss, in the middle of which is a large pineal opening.  In some specimens this boss is of only moderate thickness, while in others it has become greatly thickened into a huge mass of bone (pachyostosis). It has been suggested that these animals engaged in intra-specific head-butting behavior, presumably for territory or mates. A similar thickening of the skull occurs in pachycephalosaurian ("boneheaded") dinosaurs, and it is speculated that all of these animals practiced head-butting behavior like modern goats and bighorn sheep, or Late Eocene titanotheres.

In keeping with their vegetarian lifestyle, the chisel-edged teeth are undifferentiated, lacking canines, and rather peg-like.  In maturity the teeth have a talon and a crushing heel and the upper and lower teeth of the whole battery intermesh.

Size
The trend towards gigantism, so typical of many of the dinocephalians, was characteristic of even the earliest known members of this family. Along with pareiasaurs, these were the heavyweights of the middle Permian.

Palaeobiology

Ecology

There is some disagreement over whether these animals lived in dry upland environments (Colbert), swamps, or either, depending on the species or tribe. There is no doubt that the Tapinocephalidae occupied different ecological niches. However, the tendency of earlier writers like Gregory (1926) and Boonstra (1965) to consider them semi-aquatic wallowers is reminiscent of the old fable of the sauropods consigned to the swamps because their limbs were too clumsy and their bodies too heavy for them to exist on dry land. In fact, if they were head-butters, it is unlikely they could have been clumsy swamp wallowers, since head-butting implies some degree of mobility.

Boonstra suggests that form such as Tapinocephalus and Struthiocephalus were semi-aquatic, while Moschops was terrestrial. It is quite likely that some tapinocephalid species may have frequented pond margins, feeding on soft vegetation, others preferred dry uplands.

Gregory (1926) considered that dinocephalians were aquatic animals, the wide hands and feet and the extensive fore and aft reach being useful for propelling the animal through water and the massive forehead being an advantage in diving. He suggested that the pineal organ might have been phototropic, helping the animal to orient itself relative to the surface of the water.

Tapinocephalines were seen by Boonstra (1956) as semi-aquatic animals. The cumbersome body, poor locomotor apparatus and feeble lower jaw and massive cranium all suggested to him that these animals could not have fed efficiently on land on tough vegetation. Instead he presented them as wallowers, being buoyed up by water, feeding on soft marsh vegetation.

Physiology

Rescuing the tapinocephalids from a life of diluvian swamp-wallowing, Bakker (1975, 1986) argued that bone histology, geographic distribution, and predator-prey relationships showed that these were active, fully terrestrial and at least partially endothermic animals, midway between the ectothermic pelycosaurs and the fully endothermic theriodonts.

Others like McNab and Geist suggest that the tapinocephalids were better considered inertial homeotherms, with the large barrel-like body and short tail being the most efficient surface for conserving heat.

References

External links 
 Tapinocephalidae at Kheper
 Tapinocephalidae at Palaeos

Tapinocephalians
Guadalupian first appearances
Guadalupian extinctions
Prehistoric therapsid families